Gauri Karnik (born 20 December 1977) is a Hindi and Marathi film actress. She is best known for her acting in Sur in 2002.

Personal life
Karnik is married to filmmaker Sarim Momin since 2010 and lives in Mumbai.

Career

Acting
She started her career by doing acting in the episodes of Rishtey like "Khel Khel Mein" which was aired on Zee TV during 1999-2001. Gauri Karnik acted in several Hindi films. The best known so far is Sur – The Melody of Life in 2002. In 2009 she acted last in a Kannada language film Karanji.

Filmography

Awards and nominations
 Nominated 
 2003: Star Screen Award Most Promising Newcomer - Female for Sur

References

External links
 

1977 births
Indian film actresses
Female models from Maharashtra
Living people
Actresses from Maharashtra
Actresses in Hindi cinema
Actresses in Marathi cinema
Indian soap opera actresses
21st-century Indian actresses
Marathi actors